Zsolt Vadicska (born 16 April 1969 in Kunhegyes) is a Hungarian former football player.

Honours
 Debreceni VSC
Hungarian Cup: 1999, 2001

References
HLSZ
European Football Clubs & Squads
Magyar Version of Wikipedia
Futballévkönyv 1999, I kötet, 83–87. Volume, 83–87. o., Aréna 2000 kiadó, Budapest, 2000  P., 2000 Publisher Arena, Budapest, 2000 

1969 births
Living people
People from Kunhegyes
Hungarian footballers
Szolnoki MÁV FC footballers
Egri FC players
Diósgyőri VTK players
Debreceni VSC players
Association football midfielders
Sportspeople from Jász-Nagykun-Szolnok County